was a designer of ukiyo-e style Japanese woodblock prints.  He first studied with his father, Eiji, a minor painter of the Kanō school, and subsequently with Suzuki Nanrei (1775–1844), of the Shijō school.  He is believed to have also studied with ukiyo-e artist Totoya Hokkei (1790–1850).  He produced numerous woodblock prints of beautiful women (bijin-ga) in the 1830s, but then abandoned printmaking in favor of painting.

This artist should not be confused with Harukawa Eizan, an ukiyo-e print designer who was active in the 1790s.

Eizan was the most prolific, longest-lived and ultimately the best of those late followers of Utamaro who attempted to carry on the master's bijin style after his death in 1806.

Along with Tsukimaro and Utamaro II, Eizan has generally been dismissed by connoisseurs as a plagiarist of Utamaro's late style, but his work in fact develops, like that of most ukiyo-e artists, from a close identification with a leading master to a studied independence, and contains pieces of remarkable beauty and interest.

As Eizan reached artistic maturity he began to develop his own figural style, still focused for the most part on prints of beautiful women (bijin-ga). Eizan's work retains the sensitivities and lyricism that marks the Utamaro style, as opposed to the earthier realism and more overt sensuality of Kunisada and Keisai Eisen.

Eizan, like Toyokuni I in actor prints, is the last manifestation of the classical ukiyo-e style in bijin work, with harmonious colors and graceful lines and subjects. After him, one senses the introduction of a different aesthetic, with harsher colors, angular lines and less ethereal material, more of an emphasis, in sum, on the material weight of earthly life, rather than its transformation into something of elegance.

With Eizan, the alchemy of elegance is still alive, and in his best work, properly produced, he can cast a magic glow over the forms of the world and create lightness and grace.

He is also left-handed, which was strange at such a time in Japan.

Gallery

References

 Lane, Richard. (1978).  Images from the Floating World, The Japanese Print. Oxford: Oxford University Press. ;  OCLC 5246796.
 Newland, Amy Reigle. (2005). Hotei Encyclopedia of Japanese Woodblock Prints.  Amsterdam: Hotei. ;  OCLC 61666175 

Ukiyo-e artists
Japanese printmakers
1787 births
1867 deaths